Bilafond Glacier is located in Siachen region across Karakoram Range in Pakistan. It is a main source for Saltoro River. It is under Pakistani control.

See also
Glaciers of Pakistan

References 

Glaciers of the Karakoram
Glaciers of Gilgit-Baltistan
India–Pakistan border